Parangdo, literally Wave Island, may refer to:

 Parangdo, another name for Socotra Rock, a disputed reef in the East China Sea
 An island of uncertain location claimed by South Korea in 1951; see Rusk documents